Reg Kent (21 November 1943 – 17 November 2021) was an Australian rules footballer who played with Footscray in the Victorian Football League (VFL). 	

After he left the VFL, Kent became a journeyman, spending time with East Ballarat in the Ballarat Football League and winning the goalkicking on three occasions. He later played for South Warrnambool and topped the Hampden Football League goalkicking twice. While playing for Geelong West he topped the Geelong & District Football League goalkicking in 1978.

Notes

External links 		
		
				
		
	
1943 births	
2021 deaths
Australian rules footballers from Victoria (Australia)
Western Bulldogs players
East Ballarat Football Club players
South Warrnambool Football Club players
Geelong West Football Club players